Brian Keith Blades (born July 24, 1965) is an American former professional football player who was a wide receiver for the Seattle Seahawks of the National Football League (NFL).

Blades graduated from Piper High School in Sunrise, Florida in 1983.  He attended the University of Miami.

He finished his college career with 80 catches for 1,493 yards and 15 TDs.

After graduating, he was chosen in the 2nd round (49th overall) of the 1988 NFL Draft by the Seattle Seahawks. Blades spent his entire 11-year career with the Seahawks, playing for the team from 1988-1998. He signed a one-year contract with the Seahawks prior to the 1999 season, but was cut on June 5, 1999. in 1989 Blades won the Marcus Nalley MVP award, also that year (1989) he was voted into the pro bowl after having 1,063 receiving yards and 5 TD receptions.

Manslaughter conviction and acquittal 

Blades was charged with murder in the second degree for the death of his cousin, Charles Blades Jr. Blades initially pleaded "no contest" but later changed his plea to "not guilty" before the trial. Blades claimed the pistol accidentally discharged a round into his cousin during a struggle. During the trial, the prosecuting attorney and a gun expert staged a mock struggle with a blank filled gun, in which the gun accidentally discharged.

After a jury convicted Blades of manslaughter, the presiding Judge Susan Lebow overturned the verdict 72 hours later, citing the prosecution's failure to provide enough evidence for conviction. The case was appealed to the Fourth District Court of Appeal, and the court upheld his acquittal.

Personal life

He is the older brother of former NFL cornerbacks Bennie Blades and Al Blades. He is also the uncle of former University of Pittsburgh and Washington Redskins linebacker H. B. Blades. He and his wife Tisha, 2 daughters Brittany and Brianne, and 1 son Brian II live in Ft. Lauderdale, Florida.

References 

1965 births
Living people
American Conference Pro Bowl players
American football wide receivers
Miami Hurricanes football players
Players of American football from Fort Lauderdale, Florida
Seattle Seahawks players
Piper High School (Florida) alumni
Ed Block Courage Award recipients